Marian Dinu (born 15 August 1965) is a Romanian football coach and former player. As a coach, he works with Petre Grigoraș, being his assistant coach at Farul Constanţa, Oţelul Galaţi, Pandurii Târgu Jiu, ASA Târgu Mureș and Poli Timișoara.

Dinu played for Farul Constanța 284 times and scored 7 times, being the second, after Antonescu, in the top of presences. He also played for Callatis Mangalia and Unirea Slobozia.

External links
 

1965 births
Living people
People from Constanța County
Romanian footballers
Association football defenders
Liga I players
Liga II players
FCV Farul Constanța players
AFC Unirea Slobozia players
Romanian football managers
ASC Oțelul Galați managers
FCV Farul Constanța managers